The Avignon Film Festival (created 1984), also known as the Avignon/New York Film Festival or Rencontres Cinématographiques Franco-Américain d'Avignon, took place every year in Avignon, France along with a twin film festival organised in New York. It was last held in 2008.

History 
Avignon Film Festival was created to promote French/American independent cinema through previews, retrospectives and round-tables.

An award ceremony encouraged young film directors to participate in the festival. The purpose was to bring together independent filmmakers from the United States, France and other European countries. Their mission was to encourage deeper understanding and appreciation for contemporary, thought-provoking cinema by showcasing the work of innovative filmmakers. Feature films, short films and documentaries were presented in French, English and other European languages. Every French film was subtitled in English, and European films in English or French. Film directors, producers and screenwriters could join the discussions about their work with the public.

In 1993 the Harvard Film Archive invited the organisation to co-produce the first American edition of Rencontres Cinématographiques franco-américaines d'Avignon. In 1994, the founder, Jérôme Henry Rudes, launched the Avignon/New York Film Festival at the Angelika Film Center in Manhattan. The festivals were held in June and November. The term "Avignon Film Festival" was born in 2000 due to the extension of the program to Europe.

Awards 
 Le Roger: awarded to the Best Feature film from France, the Best Feature film from the USA, the Best Short film from France and the Best Short film from the USA.
Filming Award: awarded to the three best feature films (American, French and European).
 Panavision Award: for the three best short films
 Kodak Vision Award: for best filmmaking
 SACD Scénario Award: for the two best scriptwriters

Le Roger Award Recipients 
1996:

 Best Feature - France: Le fabuleux destin de Madame Petlet / Camille de Casabianca
 Best Feature - USA: Slings & Arrows / Geoffrey Sharp
 Best Short - France: En garde, monsieur / Didier Fontan
 Best Short - USA: Black Kites / Jo Andres

1997:

 Best Feature - France: Des nouvelles du bon Dieu / Didier Le Pêcheur
 Best Feature - USA: 'M' Word / Brett Parker
 Best Short - France: Double jeu / Emmanuel Oberg
 Best Short - USA: Around the Time / Phil Bertelsen

1998:

 Best Feature - France: Artemisia / Agnès Merlet
 Best Feature - USA: Once We Were Strangers / Emanuele Crialese
 Best Short - France: Théo, t'es là? / Julie Lipinski
 Best Short - USA: Tree Shade / Lisa Collins
 Separate Star Award: Pyeon ji / Pierre Anais
 Vision Award: Little Red Riding Hood / Scott Ramsey

1999:

 Best Feature - France: Le ciel, les oiseaux,... et ta mère! / Djamel Bensalah
 Best Feature - USA: Man of the Century / Adam Abraham
 Best Short - France: Personne avant toi / Olivier Lécot
 Best Short - USA: Making Change / Georgia Irwin Eisner
 Separate Star Award: Weekend Getaway / Elizabeth Holder
 Vision Award: The Money Shot / Elia Lyssy

2000:

 Best Feature - France: Salsa / Joyce Buñuel
 Best Feature - USA: Blue Moon / John A. Gallagher
 Best Short - France: Samedi, dimanche et aussi lundi / Eric Valette
 Best Short - USA: City of Thieves / Jason Brandenberg
 Separate Star Award: Générique / Xavier de Choudens
 Vision Award: The Citizen / Oliver Bokelberg
 Honorary Roger: Vox Lumiere – Metropolis / Kevin Saunders Hayes (For his new score)

2001:

 Best Feature - France: Origine contrôlée / Zakia Tahri & Ahmed Bouchaala
 Best Feature - USA: How to Kill Your Neighbor's Dog / Michael Kalesniko
 Best Short - France: Raconte / Guillaume Malandrin
 Best Short - USA: Here / Brendan Donovan
 Separate Star Award: Raconte / Guillaume Malandrin
 Vision Award: The Photographer / Vanja Cernjul
 Honorary Roger: Jacqueline Bisset (In recognition of her 30-year acting career both in France and America), Vox Lumiere – The Hunchback of Notre Dame: Kevin Saunders Hayes (For his new score)

2002:

 Best Feature - France: Grégoire Moulin contre l'humanité / Artus de Penguern
 Best Feature - USA: The Holy Land / Eitan Gorlin
 Best Short - France: Les petits oiseaux / Fred Louf
 Best Short - USA: Celebration / Daniel Stedman
 Vision Award: Pourquoi se marier le jour de la fin du monde? / Harry Cleven

2003:

 Best Feature - France: Les diables / Christophe Ruggia
 Best Feature - USA: Melvin Goes to Dinner / Bob Odenkirk
 Best Short - France: J'attendrai le suivant... / Philippe Orreindy
 Best Short - USA: Coyote Beach / Markus Griesshammer
 Vision Award: The Quality of Mercy / Stephen Marro
 "Valérie" Award: Sandra Schulberg
 Special Roger: Wings / Sasha Gordon (For artistic accomplishment - original score)

2004:

 Best Feature - France: Comme si de rien n'était / Pierre-Olivier Mornas
 Best Feature - USA: David Hockney: The Colors of Music / Maryte Kavaliauskas & Seth Schneidman
 Best Short - France: Soyons attentifs... / Thierry Sebban
 Best Short - USA: The Reunion / Ben Epstein

2005:

 Best Feature - France: Ze film / Guy Jacques
 Best Feature - USA: Lbs. / Matthew Bonifacio
 Best Short - France: Handicap / Lewis Martin Soucy
 Best Short - USA: The Method / Jason Holzman

2006:

 Best Feature - Europe: Pour l'amour de Dieu / Ahmed Bouchaala & Zakia Tahri
 Best Feature - USA: JailCity / Dan Eberle
 Best Short - Europe: Intimità / Matteo Minetto
 Best Short - USA: Hot Afternoons Have Been in Montana / Ken Kimmelman
 Pierre Salinger Award for Documentary Filmmaking: Blues by the Beach / Joshua Faudem
 Chateuneuf-du-Pape Cinema Award: John Turturro

2007:

 Best Feature - Europe: Komma / Martine Doyen
 Best Feature - USA: Superheroes / Alan Brown
 Best Short - Europe: Il était une fois... Sasha et Désiré / Cécile Vernant
 Best Short - USA: To Paint the Portrait of a Bird / Seamus McNally

External links 
 Avignon Film Festival on IMDB
 Avignon Film Festival Archives
 

Film festivals in France
Avignon